Keezhakavattankurichi is a village in the Ariyalur taluk of Ariyalur district, Tamil Nadu, India.

Demographics 

As per the 2001 census, Keezhakavattankurichi had a total population of 4857 with 2396 males and 2461 females.

References 

Villages in Ariyalur district